Microtyphlus is a genus of beetles in the family Carabidae, containing the following species:

 Microtyphlus alegrei (Espanol & Colas, 1985)
 Microtyphlus aurouxi Espanol, 1966
 Microtyphlus bateti Hernando, 2000
 Microtyphlus canovasae Toribio & Beltran, 1993
 Microtyphlus charon Ortuño & Sendra, 2011
 Microtyphlus comasi (J. Vives, Escola & E. Vives, 2002)
 Microtyphlus fadriquei (Espanol, 1999)
 Microtyphlus fideli Vinolas & Escola, 1999
 Microtyphlus ganglbaueri (Breit, 1908)
 Microtyphlus infernalis Ortuño & Sendra, 2010
 Microtyphlus jusmeti (Espanol, 1971)
 Microtyphlus menorquensis Coiffait, 1961
 Microtyphlus saxatilis Magrini, Leo & Fancello, 2004
 Microtyphlus schaumi (Saulcy, 1863)
 Microtyphlus serrratensis Coiffait, 1958
 Microtyphlus strupii (Meschnigg, 1944)
 Microtyphlus torressalai Coiffait, 1958
 Microtyphlus virgilii (J. Vives, Escola & E. Vives, 2002)
 Microtyphlus xaxarsi (Zariquiey, 1919)
 Microtyphlus zariquieyi (Bolivar & Pieltain, 1916)

References

Trechinae